Gurucharan Naik (1919-1986) was an Indian politician. He was elected to the Lok Sabha, lower house of the Parliament of India from Keonjhar in Odisha as a member of the Swatantra Party.

References

External links
Official Biographical Sketch in Lok Sabha Website

Lok Sabha members from Odisha
India MPs 1967–1970
1919 births
1986 deaths